Melodifestivalen 2012 is a Swedish song contest that was held between 4 February and 10 March 2012. It selected the fifty-second Swedish entry to be internationally represented in the Eurovision Song Contest 2012 (ESC 2012).

As in the editions between 2009–2011, a maximum of eight people were allowed on stage, while only persons of 16 years or over are eligible. However, in accordance with Eurovision rules, only six people were allowed on stage for the Swedish entry at Eurovision. The main singer(s) were required to perform vocals live on stage. However, other backing vocals can be prerecorded, along with the song's backing track.

On 20 June 2011, SVT announced an open call for Melodifestivalen 2012, with some changes in the rules. The first change is that only one web wildcard will be chosen online to compete in Melodifestivalen 2012. The participants could upload audio files instead of video files online.

The second change is that 16 songs were selected by the preliminary jury, with 15 being chosen by inviting specific composers, and another song from the chosen web wildcard, making a total of 32 songs again. The third change involves former Swedish Eurovision representative Christer Björkman being promoted from event producer to the executive producer of Melodifestivalen 2012. However, all songs were presented by Sveriges Television (SVT) from October to December 2011.

For the web competition, authors could upload their audio file on SVT's website between 1–20 September 2011. There were separate categories in the upload for established composers and newcomers. A total of 3,485 songs were uploaded: 570 for the web wildcard and 2,915 for the annual contest.

Helena Paparizou was the guest of honor at the final of the festival. She sang a jazz-dance version of the song by Eric Saade "Popular".

Format 
The format of the 2012 Melodifestivalen was similar to the previous ten contests, with four heats, a second chance round, and a grand final. The four heats were held in Växjö (4 February), Gothenburg (11 February), Leksand (18 February) and Malmö (25 February). The second chance round was held in Nyköping on 3 March while the final in Stockholm was held on 10 March. SVT will present the competing songs during October–December 2011.

Schedule

Changes 
 In the web wildcard contest, it is only the song and not the artist who competes.
 The entries must be at least two minutes long.
 Foreign songwriters may submit entries to both the web wildcard contest and Melodifestivalen itself, but the songs must have at least one Swedish writer.

Entries 
32 songs competed in Melodifestivalen 2012. 16 of them were selected from a public call for songs, in which public songwriters and artists could send in songs to SVT, until 20 September 2011. The format for the contest remained the same as in 2011; the same format that was introduced in 2002. The 32 songs were first presented over four heats. A public televote was held to select two songs to progress directly to the final, with the third and fourth placed songs progressing to a Second Chance (Andra Chansen) round. The entries were presented on 9 November 2011. On 21 and 28 November 2011, SVT presented the artists for each song.

Web wildcard 
As in the 2010 and 2011 contests, SVT held a web wildcard contest. SVT chose to do this for the public to directly choose a song in the competition. However, the difference from 2011 is that only one entry was chosen by the public, instead of two. From 1–20 September 2011, musicians with no previous music contract were able to submit songs to the SVT Melodifestivalen website. The contest was due to begin on 3 October and end on 7 November 2011.

Unlike the two previous years, it was only the song and not the artist (in combination with the song) that would compete. In addition, the requirement of having a video for the song was abolished. Since the winning song will not have an artist attached, it was SVT (in consultation with the winning song's writers) who decided which artist or group would present the entry in Melodifestivalen.

On 1 September 2011, SVT announced major changes in the web wildcard contest. A major change is that the public can only vote once in a voting round. The major change is that the contest is divided into a mini version of Melodifestivalen. It will become a contest with heats and a grand final.

Of the total 570 submissions of web wildcard entries, SVT will review them, and then select the 32 entries that will compete in the four heat heats. The first heat was held on 10 October. However, SVT revealed these entries one week earlier, on 3 October. The voting round was held on 10 October between 12:00 and 13:00 CET. The winning entry and one entry that SVT choose will go to the final. The remaining three heats will be held on 17 October, 24 October and 31 October. However, SVT will reveal the heat entries one week before each heat will begin. On 31 October, a total of eight songs will qualify for the final, which will be held on 7 November. Finals will be determined by telephone voting. It is not decided on the final will be broadcast live on SVT.

On 7 October 2011, SVT announced that four web wildcards were disqualified due to rule violations. All four songs had been published on other websites before the competition began, contrary to SVT's rules. However, on 14 October 2011, SVT disqualified the replaced song "No Games" by Leslie Tay. "No Games" was disqualified due to the writer having released music through a commercial record companies, in violation of the rules. The songs which have been disqualified are:

 "Set Me Free" - Trison (was not replaced).
 "Mary Doesn't Care" - My Niece (replaced by "She Is Love" - Fredrik Sjöstedt).
 "Stars Might Shine" - Albin Loán (replaced by "No Games" - Chris Mhina).
 "Fine" - My Niece (replaced by "Kärleken ler" - Ricky och Ronny).
 "No Games" - Chris Mhina (replaced by "Jag kommer ut" - San Francisco).

Rules 
 Only non-established artists and songwriters can submit entries to the web wildcard contest.
 Authors who compete must not have had the musical works published previously (prior to 1 October 2011).
 During the contest, contestants entries only be published on the Melodifestivalen website. Authors must not publish entries to other websites in video format. The exception is that you link the song from SVT Play to other websites.
 SVT has the right to refuse entry to the competition if the audio file has bad sound quality.
 SVT has the right to refuse entry to the competition, if the content is considered offensive or violates the regular contest rules.

Heats 
Voting in each heat will be held between 12:00 to 13:00 CET. Later in the afternoon, around 13:30 to 14:00 CET, SVT announce the winner and their own choice at Melodifestivalen website. However, SVT keep secret which finalists viewers chose and which SVT chose. The remaining songs will be eliminated. However, all songs in each heat will be released on Melodifestivalen website one week before the heat will begin. The heats will take place during these dates:

 Monday 10 October 2011 - Heat 1
 Monday 17 October 2011 - Heat 2
 Monday 24 October 2011 - Heat 3
 Monday 31 October 2011 - Heat 4
 Monday 7 November 2011 - Final

Heat 1

Heat 2 

* The songwriter for the song "A Heartbeat Away" chose not to present the demo artist to its song. Therefore, it is unknown who sings the song.

Heat 3

Heat 4

Web wildcard final 
The final were held on November 7, 2011. It was broadcast live in the radio show P4 Extra with the host Lotta Bromé. The eight songs will be played in a quick review at approx. 13:20. The voting were held between 13:00 to 14:00. The results were revealed at approx. 14:33. The final draw:

* The songwriter for the song "A Heartbeat Away" chose not to present the demo artist to its song. Therefore, it is unknown who sings the song.

Heats 
The four heats will this year be held in Växjö, Gothenburg, Leksand and Malmö. The jury, which chose the sixteen songs of around 3000 submissions, were selected at the end of September 2011. SVT's fifteen wild cards and the jury's choice were revealed on 9 November 2011. The web wildcard were chosen by viewers on 7 November 2011. SVT will announce the first sixteen artists on 21 November and the remaining sixteen artists on 28 November, during two press conferences. On the first press conference, the entries and artists for the first and second heat were revealed, however, on the second press conference, the entries and artists for the third and fourth heat will be revealed. It is not yet decided when the draw for each heat will be revealed.

On 21 November 2011, the first 16 artists were presented, which featured the return of several former Melodifestivalen artists: Loreen, The Moniker, the 2011 Melodifestivalen host Marie Serneholt, the 2002 Melodifestivalen winner Afro-Dite, Andreas Lundstedt, Sonja Aldén and Timoteij. It was also revealed that the song "Porslin" were replaced by the song "Shout It Out", due to SVT couldn't find the right artist for the song.

On 28 November 2011, the last 16 artist were presented, which also featured the return of several former Melodifestivalen artists like Mattias Andréasson and Danny Saucedo from the group E.M.D., in 2012 Melodifestivalen they will solo-compete and Charlotte Perrelli, winner of Eurovision Song Contest 1999. Other Swedish artists who will return to Melodifestivalen again are Love Generation, Andreas Johnson, Molly Sandén, Lotta Engberg and Christer Sjögren (in a duet) and Hanna Lindblad. The rock band Dynazty, which performed the 2010 winning song "This is my life" in the 2011 Melodifestivlen final, will also compete in 2012. The song "To the sky" were replaced by the song "Amazing".

The rules for the heats will be like last year, but with some changes. In the first round the artists will sing their songs, and the public will telephone- and SMS vote. After the appearances will SVT have a quick review of the songs, subsequently terminated round. The five songs which have received most telephone (and SMS) votes will qualify for round 2.

The second round will only have a quick review of the songs with new telephone and SMS-voting round. However, the five songs will keep its votes from the first round. When the round has been terminated, the two songs which have received most votes will qualify for the final. The two songs placed third and fourth will qualify to the Second chance round in Nyköping. The songs placed 5th, 6th, 7th and 8th will be eliminated from the race.

Heat 1 
The first heat was held on 4 February 2012 in VIDA Arena, Växjö. The songs are in running order.

A ^ A play on words utilising Banan's name.

Heat 2 
The second heat was held on 11 February 2012 in Scandinavium, Gothenburg. The songs are in running order.

Heat 3 
The third heat was held on 18 February 2012 in Tegera Arena, Leksand. The songs are in running order.

Heat 4 
The fourth heat was held on 25 February 2012 in Malmö Arena, Malmö. The songs are in running order.

Second Chance 
The Andra Chansen (Second Chance) round was held on 3 March in Rosvalla Nyköping Eventcenter. Eight acts qualified for this round from the heats - the songs that placed 3rd and 4th. A duel format was used, with each song battling against another in order to remain in the contest, and qualify for the final on 10 March. However, this year SVT changed the duel meetings. 2007-2011 the duel meetings were determined before the contest began, which meant that SVT decided how the eight songs would be met. This year SVT held a draw before Second Chance began. The four songs which came 3rd were in one pot, and the four songs which came 4th were in one other pot. Then SVT drew the duel meetings. The rule was that a 3rd and 4th from the same heat could not meet in a quarterfinal duel.

First round

Second round

Final 
The final of Melodifestivalen 2012 was held on 10 March 2012 at the Globe Arena in Stockholm. The two winners from each of the four heats and the two Second chance winners qualified for the final, a total of 10 songs. The winner was decided by a mix of televoting/SMS voting and jury voting.

On 3 March 2011, SVT announced the 11 international groups that made up the jury vote. Each jury group gives their points as follows: 1, 2, 4, 6, 8, 10 and 12 points. The votes from the Swedish public were calculated the same way as the previous year. The points given to each song from televoting were a percentage of 473 points (equally the same total as the combined jury vote). For example, if a song had received 10% of the vote, then it would have received 47 points. If two songs had ended up at the same position, the people’s votes would have overrule the jury.

Jury spokespersons (in order of appearances):

 - Sandra Kim, winner of Eurovision Song Contest 1986
 - Reimo Silovee
 - Klitos Klitou
 - Simon Proctor
 - Dejan Kukric
 - Bruno Berberes
 - Gina Dirawi, presenter of Melodifestivalen 2012
 - Peter Carbonaro
 - Torsten Amarell
 - Julian Vignoles
 - Tooji, Norwegian representative of Eurovision Song Contest 2012

Tredje Chansen 
Tredje Chansen (Third Chance) is a web-contest organized by Sveriges Television. Thirty-two unsuccessful Melodifestivalen entries in the past ten years will have a third opportunity for a spot in the grand final. The third chance procedure is similar to the actual one, there will be four rounds of third chances (four heats), a last chance (second-chance) and the final. There will be ten participants in the grand final. The winner will be decided by internet viewers and an expert jury while the qualifiers from the heats will be decided by the internet viewers only.

The first edition of Third Chance took place in January 2012, when Melodifestivalen 2012 began. Every week fans from Sweden, Europe and the rest of the world could vote their favourite song with 2 winners from each round (total 8 songs) to the finals and 8 songs for a last chance with available 2 spots left for the final.

Semi-final 1

Semi-final 2

Semi-final 3

Semi-final 4

Last Chance (Sista chansen)

Final

References

External links

 Melodifestivalen Official Site
http://www.svt.se/melodifestivalen/20120308190409/vi_letar_efter_en_eurovision-vinnare

Eurovision
2012
Eurovision Song Contest 2012
2012 in Swedish music
2012 song contests
February 2012 events in Europe
March 2012 events in Europe
2010s in Stockholm
2010s in Gothenburg
2010s in Malmö
Events in Stockholm
Events in Gothenburg
Events at Malmö Arena
Events in Växjö
Events in Nyköping
Events in Leksand